Dunkels is a surname. Notable people with the surname include:

 Adam Dunkels (born 1978), Swedish entrepreneur and programmer
 Paul Dunkels (born 1947), English cricketer

See also
 Dunkel (disambiguation)